Gary Stuart Hocking MBE (30 September 1937 – 21 December 1962) was a Grand Prix motorcycle racing world champion who competed in the late 1950s and early 1960s based in Rhodesia.

Early life 

Hocking was born in Caerleon, near Newport, Monmouthshire, in south-east Wales, but grew up in Southern Rhodesia (renamed Zimbabwe in 1980) where he attended Gifford High School. As a teenager, he began racing motorcycles on grass tracks. Before long, he had moved on to road racing circuits.

Motorcycle racing 

He left Rhodesia to compete in Europe in 1958 and made an immediate impact, finishing 3rd behind the works MV Agustas at the Nürburgring. He was sponsored by Manchester tuner/dealer Reg Dearden, who provided him with new 350 and 500 cc Manx Norton racing motorcycles.  He spent the winter of 1958/1959 with the Costain family at their home in Castletown on the Isle of Man, learning the Mountain Course with George  'Sparrow' Costain, an established rider for the Dearden team, who had won the Senior Manx Grand Prix on a 500 Dearden-tuned Manx in 1954. In the Junior TT of 1959 he finished 12th from 22nd on the grid.

In 1959, he was offered a ride by the East German MZ factory and finished second in the 250cc championship. During practice for the 1959 Junior TT, his 350 Manx Norton, and the machines of teammates Terry Shepherd and John Hartle, were fitted with the top-secret works 350 cc Desmodromic engine, but they ran standard engines for the actual race. MV Agusta offered Hocking full factory support for the 1960 season and he repaid their confidence by finishing 2nd in the 125 cc, 250 cc and 350 cc classes.

Following the retirement from motorcycle racing by defending champion, John Surtees in 1961, Hocking became MV Agusta's top rider and went on to claim dual World Championships in the 350 cc and 500 cc classes, in a dominant manner against little factory mounted opposition.

Auto racing 
Hocking was deeply affected by the death of his friend, Tom Phillis at the 1962 Isle of Man TT. After winning the Senior TT, he announced his retirement from motorcycle racing and returned to Rhodesia. He felt motorcycle racing was too dangerous and decided a career in auto racing would be safer. Later that year, on 22 December, he was killed during practice for the 1962 Natal Grand Prix at the Westmead circuit. His car, a Rob Walker entered Lotus 24, ran off the edge of the track at the end of the long right hand corner and somersaulted end over end twice. Hocking's head struck the roll hoop and he died some hours later in the Addington hospital in Durban. It is possible that the car suffered a front nearside suspension failure, and it is also possible that incorrectly reassembled steering – Hocking asked for a change on this item – might have been the cause; whatever was the reason, this caused the car to veer sharply to the left and somersault as he was going uphill and was approaching the crest of the rise. It is also likely that he was dehydrated and lost consciousness from that. He was 25 years old. Hocking is buried at Christchurch Cemetery, Newport in Wales.

Motorcycle Grand Prix results

(key) (Races in bold indicate pole position; races in italics indicate fastest lap)

Formula One results

Complete Formula One World Championship results
(key)

Non-championship results
(key)

References 

White Rhodesian people
British emigrants to Rhodesia
Rhodesian people of British descent
Rhodesian motorcycle racers
Welsh motorcycle racers
125cc World Championship riders
250cc World Championship riders
350cc World Championship riders
500cc World Championship riders
Isle of Man TT riders
People from Caerleon
Sportspeople from Newport, Wales
Racing drivers who died while racing
1937 births
1962 deaths
Zimbabwean motorsport people
Zimbabwean people of Welsh descent
Sport deaths in South Africa
Rhodesian Formula One drivers
Rob Walker Racing Team Formula One drivers
500cc World Riders' Champions
350cc World Riders' Champions